Edward Kerridge (23 September 1904 – 1979) was a British cyclist. He competed in the time trial event at the 1928 Summer Olympics. Kerridge was the national champion in the 10-mile event in 1926, and finished in second place in the 5-mile event in 1928.

References

External links
 

1904 births
1979 deaths
British male cyclists
Olympic cyclists of Great Britain
Cyclists at the 1928 Summer Olympics
Place of birth missing
20th-century British people